Charles Thornton Primrose Grierson was an eminent Irish clergyman in the first third of the 20th century. Gaining an MA, then ordained in 1881, he began his career with a curacy at  Kells, after which he was Rector of Stradbally and then Seapatrick, County Down. Promotion to be Dean of St Anne’s Cathedral, Belfast followed; after which he was  elevated to the episcopate as the Bishop of Down, Connor and Dromore.
Works. 
He contributed to the monumental "Dictionary of Christ and the Gospels" 1908 edited by Hastings.

References

External links
 

1857 births
Alumni of Trinity College Dublin
Deans of Belfast
20th-century Anglican bishops in Ireland
Bishops of Down, Connor and Dromore
1935 deaths